Pom Pom Strikes Back is a 1986 Hong Kong comedy film directed by Wu Ma and starring Richard Ng and John Shum. It is the fourth and final film in the Pom Pom film series which is a spin-off the Lucky Stars series.

Plot
Police officers Chow (Richard Ng) and Beethoven (John Shum) are close friend who must protect a witness May (May Lo Mei Mei) after she witnesses a gangland murder. Meanwhile Beethoven mistakenly discovers that Chow is dying of cancer and sets out to make his last few months memorable.

Cast
 Richard Ng as officer Ng Ah Chiu
 John Shum as officer Beethoven
 Deannie Yip as Mrs Anna Ng, Ng's wife
 May Lo Mei-Mei as May

References

External links
 
 

1980s Cantonese-language films
Hong Kong comedy films
1986 comedy films
1986 films
1980s Hong Kong films